The 1907 Colorado Agricultural Aggies football team represented Colorado Agricultural College (now known as Colorado State University) in the Colorado Football Association (CFA) during the 1907 college football season.  In their second season under head coach Claude Rothgeb, the Aggies compiled a 0–4 record, finished last in the CFA, and were outscored by a total of 77 to 17.

Schedule

References

Colorado Agricultural
Colorado State Rams football seasons
Colorado Agricultural Aggies football